Marke is the name of a number of places.
Marke, Germany
Marke, Belgium
Marke, Nepal